Aristotle Dreher is an American songwriter/musician from Bay Shore, New York.  He is known as a founding member and bass player for the band Vaeda.  He has also played bass for the bands Cage 9, and The Bastard Kings of Rock.

In addition to being a musician, Dreher is also a visual artist, filmmaker, and actor.

References

Interview with Ian Cole, Aristotle Dreher, and Oliver Williams - Rocknet Webzine

External links

Songwriters from New York (state)
American rock guitarists
American male guitarists
1978 births
Living people
People from Bay Shore, New York
Guitarists from New York (state)
21st-century American guitarists
21st-century American male musicians
American male songwriters